Nekrasovka is a rural locality (a selo) in Pravovostochny Selsoviet of Ivanovsky District, Amur Oblast, Russia. The population was 79 as of 2018. There are 2 streets.

Geography 
Nekrasovka is located on the right bank of the Manchzhurka River, 9 km east of Ivanovka (the district's administrative centre) by road. Sadovoye is the nearest rural locality.

References 

Rural localities in Ivanovsky District, Amur Oblast